François Scellier (born 7 May 1936 in Amiens, Somme) was a member of the National Assembly of France from 2002 to 2017, representing the 6th constituency of the Val-d'Oise department,  as a member of the Radical Party.

References

1936 births
Living people
People from Amiens
Radical Party (France) politicians
Union for a Popular Movement politicians
Deputies of the 12th National Assembly of the French Fifth Republic
Deputies of the 13th National Assembly of the French Fifth Republic
Deputies of the 14th National Assembly of the French Fifth Republic